Pseudantheraea discrepans is a species of moth of the family Saturniidae first described by Arthur Gardiner Butler in 1878. It is found in Africa, from Ivory Coast to Uganda in the north and from Angola to the Democratic Republic of the Congo in the south.

Larvae have been recorded on Entandrophragma angolense. They feed gregariously.

External links
"Insect and host plant species of Central Africa: scientific names". Food and Agriculture Organization
"Pseudantheraea discrepans". Saturniidae World

Saturniinae
Moths of Africa
Moths described in 1878